Joseph Henderson (September 9, 1826 – October 7, 1890) was a 19th-century American harbor pilot who guided large vessels into and out of New York Harbor as a Sandy Hook pilot. During his long career his work included bringing the ship that carried the Statue of Liberty safely into port after its trip from Europe, and was called upon as an expert seaman to determine the height of the water span of the Brooklyn Bridge, a new bridge from Brooklyn to New York City.

Early life
Henderson was born in Charleston, South Carolina. According to the 1880 Federal Census, Henderson's father and mother were born in South Carolina. At sixteen years of age, Henderson left Charleston to find passage to New York as a cabin boy on a ship traveling there. By 1845, he must have been well established as a New York pilot. The New York Herald notes: "Some men on South street remember him in 1845 as a pilot of some standing even then." Henderson married Angelina Annetta Weaver on February 11, 1849.

Sandy Hook pilot
Henderson was a Sandy Hook pilot in New York Harbor and along the Atlantic Coast during the American Civil War. In 1846, when Henderson was twenty years old, he took out his pilot papers with the Board of Commissioners of Pilots of the State of New York. He became adept in all branches of piloting.

Henderson was listed in the 1848 Doggett's New York City directory as a seaman at 325 Front Street, New York City. He owned several pilot ships in the Sandy Hook service. By the age of twenty-one, he was captain of his own schooner, self-educated in seamanship, and a New York Sandy Hook pilot. He spent over 45 years as a New York pilot and was in more boat accidents than any other pilots.

On September 13, 1853, Henderson became a Branch Pilot on the pilot boat Ellwood Walter, No. 7, belonging to the New York Pilots' Association. The pilot boat was named after Ellwood Walter, the president of the Mercantile Insurance Company, and was built by Edward T. Williams, of Greenpoint, Brooklyn.

On December 17, 1856, Henderson was listed as being one of the captains for the pilot boat  No. 11, George W. Blunt. On January 21, 1857, Henderson was listed as being on the Blunt, anchored at Coney Island, but hemmed in by the ice.

Civil War

During the Civil War, Henderson was a pilot on the steamboat transports Arago and Fulton, running from Newport News, Virginia to Port Royal, South Carolina. 

Henderson was one-quarter owner of the William Bell, a pilot boat built in Greenpoint, Brooklyn, New York, in 1864 and co-owned with other Sandy Hook pilots. Henderson was at sea on another vessel at the time of the capture, acting as pilot for the Government.

Post-Civil War

Steamship Tybee
In December 1869, Henderson offered his services to pilot the steam vessel Tybee out of the port of New York, leaving for San Domingo, Dominican Republic; but the shipmaster refused to employ him. The Tybee proceeded to sea without having any pilot of the port on board. In the trial, "Henderson v. Spofford," a judgment was made in the district court of New York City in favor of Joseph Henderson (plaintiff) for thirty-eight dollars and eighteen cents plus the costs for pilotage fees out of the Port of New York.

Brooklyn Bridge
In 1879, during the construction of the east river bridge, Captain Henderson was called upon as an expert seaman to determine the height of the water span of the Brooklyn Bridge, a new bridge from Brooklyn to New York City. He testified to the Assembly Sub-Committee on Commerce and Navigation, as to the difficulties masters of ships would experience in bringing their ships under the bridge when completed.

Another witness, Edward W. Serrell, who was a civil engineer, said that he had examined the plan and sections of the bridge and that the calculations of the assumed strength of the bridge were not accurate; and the effect of gales or wind would have upon the structure and upon foot passengers. There was a fear of cars being overthrown and woman being raised by the wind and cast over the railing.

Sandy Hook Pilot Boat Company
In 1883, Henderson was friends with Captain Walter Brewer, Henry Seguine, William J. Barry, and Captain Josiah Johnson. On August 30, 1883, they started the Sandy Hook Pilot Boat Company to have ownership and control of vessels and equipment for the use of pilots in the New York Harbor and water ways of Sandy Hook. They received a certificate of incorporation from Albany, New York. The capital stock raised was $100,000, which was to be invested in pilot boats and other equipment. Their office was in Burling-slip in New York City. There was opposition to the project as it was seen as forming a union. The new Sandy Hook Pilot Boat company intended to influence legislation of a bill to reduce the pilot fees.

Statue of Liberty
Henderson's appearance with the Isère was reported in several New York newspapers. On June 16, 1885, at ten o'clock Tuesday night, the Pilot Boat Pet, No. 9 was sighted by the French steamer Isère, laden with the Statue of Liberty. She was about ten miles outside the Sandy Hook lightship. Captain Joseph Henderson set sail to her and when near enough launched a dingy and pulled alongside the Isère. He was taken on board and they then headed for the Sandy Hook Lightship. Henderson judged that the night was too dark with rain falling for safe crossing of the bar. He took charge of the ship, brought the ship to an anchor, and stood offshore waiting for daylight.

On June 17, 1885, the Isère arrived at the Horseshoe of Sandy Hook and it was moved to Gravesend Bay alongside the man-of-war USS Omaha.

On Friday, at 1 o'clock, the Isère reached Bedloe's Island. The ferryboat Atlantic left the ferry house at the foot of Wall Street and then passed Governors Island. Then the Atlantic came next to the Isère. The first man from the Atlantic was Pilot Henderson.

Blizzard of 1888

In 1888, Henderson was on board the pilot boat America, No. 21 during the Great Blizzard of 1888, when the vessel rode out the storm off the Shinnecock Light. On November 9, 1888, a newspaper account titled: "Overdue Vessels Come In. Rough Weather Reported by all. Few, Of Them Seriously Damaged", which talks about not hearing from the pilot-boat Pet. no. 9. She had left port twelve days ago, and when last heard from was 300 miles east of Sandy Hook. She had a crew of six men and Joseph Henderson was in charge.

Pilot Boat Pet

On October 28, 1872, Henderson, Captain of the New York pilot boat "Pet, No. 9", sighted the brig Emily during a heavy gale. The crew of the Emily came on board the pilot boat Pet, which lay by the brig until 7 p.m., at which time the Emily capsized. It was not until the next day that the crew members were transferred from the Pet to the steamship Italy, from Liverpool, and brought to the New York port.

On February 3, 1877, an article from the Spirit of the Times newspaper wrote about Henderson and the pilot-boat Pet. "This week, in connection with a picture of the pilot-boat Pet, Captain Joseph Henderson, we give a brief sketch, the object of which is to explain how the business of these craft is conducted in the port of New York."

On September 22, 1880, the pilot boat Pet, No. 9, ran across the schooner Gladiator, which sailed from Barbados for Yarmouth, Nova Scotia, that was overturned bottom up. The crew lowered a boat, which went alongside the vessel. They cut a hole in her side to sink her but discovered a terrible stench that was coming from below. A man was discovered with a rope around his neck hanging from the bowsprit. The crew of the vessel were laying dead in her cabin.

On November 20, 1889, Henderson was commander of the pilot boat Pet, No. 9, which was lost in the Newport, Rhode Island harbor. Pilot boat Pet, No. 9, of New York went ashore this morning on the east side of Conanicut Island, halfway between Beaver Tail and Mackerel Cove, Rhode Island. The wind died out and they let go her anchor, but it would not hold, and the heavy sea drove the boat on the rocks. The seas broke over her and she filled and sank. The agile Henderson and other pilots escaped with their lives. She was later reported as having gone to pieces and left abandoned; she was partly insured.

Teutonic and City of New York

On August 13, 1890, Henderson took the White Star Line passenger steamer RMS Teutonic to sea on her first westward race across the Atlantic with the steamship SS City of New York. The race ended in victory for the Teutonic. The race from Queenstown harbor, Ireland to Sandy Hook, took five days and nineteen hours.

On August 21, 1890, the big steamship liner Teutonic and liner City of New York raced from the New York pier to the Sandy Hook bar out to the bay. Hundreds of people were present to observe the famous liners as they departed. The pilot on the Teutonic was Captain Joseph Henderson, the pilot on the City of New York was Peter McEnneny. After seeing the vessels safely outside the bay, the pilots were taken off by Pilot boat Lillie, No. 8. Pilot Henderson said the Teutonic crossed the bar at 9:42 AM. Pilot Peter McEnenerny said the City of New York crossed at 10:20 AM. The Teutonic went at the rate of 17 knots an hour. It was expected that the vessels would be in sight of each other for 2–3 days. The best eastern record was held by the New York's twin sister, the City of Paris, which made the passage in 1889 in less than 6 days.

USS Baltimore
On August 23, 1890, Henderson guided the cruiser USS Baltimore out to sea when she carried inventor Captain John Ericsson remains to their final resting place in Stockholm, Sweden.

Death

On October 4, 1890, Henderson left home in good health and sailed to Sandy Hook on board his pilot boat America, No. 21. During this trip, he became ill and was brought home to New York and died of peritonitis on October 7, 1890, at his home in Brooklyn. He was one of the oldest pilots in service.  He was buried in the Green-Wood Cemetery.

See also
List of Northeastern U. S. Pilot Boats

References

External links
 The Sandy Hook Pilots website

  

  

1826 births
1890 deaths
Sea captains
Maritime pilotage
Burials at Green-Wood Cemetery
People from Brooklyn